Hecatesia fenestrata, the common whistling moth, is a moth of the family Noctuidae. It is endemic to south-eastern Australia.

The wingspan is about 30 mm. The forewings are black with two white bands. In males, there is a patch without scales, located near the costa. Instead of the scales, they have a ribbed area, used to make a clicking-whistling sound when flying by rubbing this ribbed area against a small protrusion. The noise is probably used to attract females. The hindwings are orange with a black border.

The larvae feed on Cassytha melantha. They have sparse white hairs along the body and irregular bands of orange, black and pale yellow, as well as a prominent lateral pale yellow line, and an area of red near the tail.

References

Agaristinae
Moths described in 1829